National identity is a person's identity or sense of belonging to one or more states or to one or more nations. It is the sense of "a nation as a cohesive whole, as represented by distinctive traditions, culture, and language". National identity may refer to the subjective feeling one shares with a group of people about a nation, regardless of one's legal citizenship status. National identity is viewed in psychological terms as "an awareness of difference", a "feeling and recognition of 'we' and 'they'". National identity also includes the general population and diaspora of multi-ethnic states and societies that have a shared sense of common identity identical to that of a nation while being made up of several component ethnic groups. Hyphenated ethnicities are an example of the confluence of multiple ethnic and national identities within a single person or entity.

As a collective phenomenon, national identity can arise as a direct result of the presence of elements from the "common points" in people's daily lives: national symbols, language, the nation's history, national consciousness, and cultural artifacts.

Under the International Law a term national identity, with respect to states, is interchangeable with the term state's identity or sovereign identity of the state. State's identity by definition in related to the Constitutional name of the state used as a legal identification in international relations and an essential element of the state's international juridical personality. Sovereign identity of the nation also represent a common denominator for identification of the national culture or cultural identity and under the International Law any external interference into the cultural identity or cultural  beliefs and traditions appears to be inadmissible. Any deprivation or external modification of the cultural national identity seems to violate the basic collective human rights.   

The expression of one's national identity seen in a positive light is patriotism which is characterized by national pride and positive emotion of love for one's country. The extreme expression of national identity is chauvinism, which refers to the firm belief in the country's superiority and extreme loyalty toward one's country.

Formation of national identity 

National identity is not an inborn trait and it is essentially socially constructed. A person's national identity results directly from the presence of elements from the "common points" in people's daily lives: national symbols, languages, colors, nation's history, blood ties, culture, music, cuisine, radio, television, and so on. Under various social influences, people incorporate national identity into their personal identities by adopting beliefs, values, assumptions and expectations which align with one's national identity. People with identification of their nation view national beliefs and values as personally meaningful, and translate these beliefs and values into daily practices.

Many scholars categorized nationalism as civic and ethnic nationalism. Ethnic nationalism focuses on the belief in myths of common ancestry, biological inheritance, blood relations, similarities in language and religion. Contrary, civic nationalism focuses on a common territorial homeland and involvement in its society. It generates a distinctive shared culture that all citizens embrace a community. It was ethnic nationalism that contributed to the collapse of the Soviet Union, where many tensions arose when two or more ethnic groups shared the same territory. The question about which ethnic identity should be dominant was a significant problem. Therefore, in literature, civic nationalism is characteristic of culturally developed nations that can, from a self-confident position, approach each other on an equal footing, seeking cooperation based on mutual respect. In contrast, ethnic nationalism is indicative of less advanced nations, caused by feelings of inadequacy and inspiring belligerent policies. Gellner (1983, pp. 99–100) intensifies the national–cultural distinction by claiming that Western civic nations are assembled based on high culture. In contrast, Eastern civic societies are joined based on a local, popular, and traditional culture.  Ignatieff (1993, pp. 7–8). kept the same line by debating that ethnic nationalism is the uneducated masses' nationalism where the community defines the individual and not vice versa.

Three main schools of defining national identity exist. Essentialists view national identity as fixed, based on ancestry, a common language history, ethnicity, and world views (Connor 1994; Huntington 1996). Constructivists believed in an importance of politics and the use of power by dominant groups to gain and maintain privileged status in society (Brubaker, 2009; Spillman, 1997; Wagner-Pacifici & Schwartz, 1991). Finally, the civic identity school focuses on shared values about rights and State institutions' legitimacy to govern.

A few scholars investigated how popular culture connects with the identity-building process. Some found that contemporary music genres can strengthen ethnic identity by increasing the feeling of ethnic pride.

Conceptualization 
Political scientist Rupert Emerson defined national identity as "a body of people who feel that they are a nation". This definition of national identity was endorsed by social psychologist, Henri Tajfel, who formulated social identity theory together with John Turner. Social identity theory adopts this definition of national identity and suggests that the conceptualization of national identity includes both self-categorization and affect. Self-categorization refers to identifying with a nation and viewing oneself as a member of a nation. The affect part refers to the emotion a person has with this identification, such as a sense of belonging, or emotional attachment toward one's nation. The mere awareness of belonging to a certain group invokes positive emotions about the group, and leads to a tendency to act on behalf of that group, even when the other group members are sometimes personally unknown.

National identity requires the process of self-categorization and it involves both the identification of in-group (identifying with one's nation), and differentiation of out-groups (other nations). By recognizing commonalities such as having common descent and common destiny, people identify with a nation and form an in-group, and at the same time they view people that identify with a different nation as out-groups. Social identity theory suggests a positive relationship between identification of a nation and derogation of other nations. By identifying with one's nation, people involve in intergroup comparisons, and tend to derogate out-groups. However, several studies have investigated this relationship between national identity and derogating other countries, and found that identifying with national identity does not necessarily result in out-group derogation.

National identity, like other social identities, engenders positive emotions such as pride and love to one's nation, and feeling of obligations toward other citizens. The socialization of national identity, such as socializing national pride and a sense of the country's exceptionalism contributes to harmony among ethnic groups. For example, in the U.S, by integrating diverse ethnic groups in the overarching identity of being an American, people are united by a shared emotion of national pride and the feeling of belonging to the U.S, and thus tend to mitigate ethnic conflicts.

From the point of International Law, sovereign national identity could not be subject of a treaty regulation or revision and any international treaty aiming to create or change the national identity of the sovereign state appears to violate the jus cogens rights of the nation. Treaty of revision of the national identity could be subject to termination under the Article 53 of the Vienna Convention on the Law of Treaties (that states: "A treaty is void if, at the time of its conclusion, it conflicts with a peremptory norm of general international law."). Any deprivation or revision of the sovereign national identity appears to constitute an ethnocide. National identity could not be subject of imposition, revision or deprivation under any circumstances.

Salience 
National identity can be most noticeable when the nation confronts external or internal enemy and natural disasters. An example of this phenomenon is the rise in patriotism and national identity in the U.S after the terrorist attacks on September 11, 2001. The identity of being an American is salient after the terrorist attacks and American national identity is evoked. Having a common threat or having a common goal unites people in a nation and enhances national identity.

Sociologist Anthony Smith argues that national identity has the feature of continuity that can transmit and persist through generations. By expressing the myths of having common descent and common destiny, people's sense of belonging to a nation is enhanced. However, national identities can disappear across time as more people live in foreign countries for a longer time, and can be challenged by supranational identities, which refers to identifying with a more inclusive, larger group that includes people from multiple nations.

Research on the study abroad experience that focused on the effects of American stereotypes found that American students faced challenges in connecting with their host country during their study abroad experience because of stereotypes of American identity. A stereotype that affected their experience was connected to politics during the election of Trump, the study found that students would disengage, distance, avoid, assimilate, or challenge their identity or host culture in response to the interactions they faced (Goldstein, 97). These preconceived ideas by the host culture and even by Americans affect the ability of people from different backgrounds to understand and accept one another as an individual rather than the stereotype of a cultural group.

People 
The people are the basic concept for a national identity. But people can be identified and constructed through different logics of nationalism. Examples range from the Völkisch movement to people's republics.

National consciousness

A national consciousness is a shared sense of national identity and a shared understanding that a people group shares a common ethnic/linguistic/cultural background. Historically, a rise in national consciousness has been the first step towards the creation of a nation. National consciousness, at a glance, is one's level of awareness, of the collective and one's understanding that without "them" there is no "us". It is the mere awareness of the many shared attitudes and beliefs towards things like family, customs, societal and gender roles, etc. The awareness allows one to have a "collective identity" which allows them to be knowledgeable of not only where they are but how those places and people around them are so significant in that they ultimately make the collective, a nation. In short, national consciousness can be defined as a specific core of attitudes that provide habitual modes for regarding life's phenomena.

National identities in Europe and the Americas developed along with the idea of political sovereignty invested in the people of the state. In Eastern Europe, it was also often linked to ethnicity and culture. Nationalism requires first a national consciousness, the awareness of national communality of a group of people, or nation. An awakening of national consciousness is frequently ascribed to national heroes and is associated with national symbols.

National identity can be thought of as a collective product. Through socialization, a system of beliefs, values, assumptions, and expectations are transmitted to group members. The collective elements of national identity may include national symbols, traditions, and memories of national experiences and achievements. These collective elements are rooted in the nation's history. Depending on how much the individual is exposed to the socialization of this system, people incorporate national identity into their personal identity to different degrees and in different ways, and the collective elements of national identity may become important parts of an individual's definition of the self and how they view the world and their own place in it.

Perspectives

Benedict Anderson 
Nations, to Benedict Anderson, are imagined. The idea of the "imagined community" is that a nation is socially constructed, and the nation is made up of individuals who see themselves as part of a particular group. Anderson referred to nations as "imagined communities". He thought that nations, or imagined communities, were delimited because of their boundaries as far as who is in and who is out. Anderson believed that the nation operates through exclusion. Though, nations exclude those who are outside of it but also their members who are not immediately considered in the collective idea of their national identity. Anderson thought that nations were delimited and also were:

Limited: Because of the mental boundaries, or concepts, we set pertaining to others are by culture, ethnicity, etc. We do not imagine everyone in one society or under one nationalism, but we mentally separate.

Sovereign: Nations were sovereign because sovereignty is a symbol of freedom from traditional religious practices. Sovereignty provides the organization needed for a nation while it is kept free of traditional religious pressures.

Ernest Gellner 
Unlike Benedict Anderson, Gellner thought that nations are not "imagined communities". In his book, Ernest Gellner explained how he thought that nations originated. In his eyes, nations are entirely modern constructs and products of nationalism. Gellner believed nations to be a result of the Industrial Revolution. Since large numbers of people from different backgrounds were coming together in cities, a common identity had to be made among them. The spread of capitalism bought the demand for constant retraining and Gellner thought that as a result, the demand was met by creating a common past, common culture, and language, which lead to the birth of nations.

Gellner thought that nations were contingencies and not universal necessities. He said that our idea of the nation was as such.

Two men were only of the same only if they were from the same culture. In this case, culture is "a system of ideas, signs, associations, and ways of communicating.

Two men are of the same nation only if they recognize each other as being a part of the same nation.

It was men's recognition of each other as people of the same kind that made them a nation and not their common attributes.

Paul Gilbert 
In "The Philosophy of Nationalism", Paul Gilbert breaks down what he thinks a nation is and his ideas contrast those of both Anderson and Gellner. In the book, Gilbert acknowledges that nations are many things. Gilbert says nations are:

Nominalist: Whatever a group of people who consider themselves a nation say a nation is 

Voluntarist: "Group of people bound by a commonly-willed nation" 

Territorial: Group of people located in the same proximity, or territory 

Linguistic: People who share the same language.

Axiological: Group of people who have the same distinctive values

Destinarian: Group of people who have a common history, and a common mission

Challenges

Ethnic identity 

In countries that have multiple ethnic groups, ethnic identity and national identity may be in conflict. These conflicts are usually referred to as ethno-national conflict. One of the famous ethno-national conflicts is the struggle between the Australian government and aboriginal population in Australia. The Australian government and majority culture imposed policies and framework that supported the majority, European-based cultural values and a national language as English. The aboriginal cultures and languages were not supported by the state, and were nearly eradicated by the state during the 20th century. Because of these conflicts, aboriginal population identify less or do not identify with the national identity of being an Australian, but their ethnic identities are salient.

Immigration 
As immigration increases, many countries face the challenges of constructing national identity and accommodating immigrants. Some countries are more inclusive in terms of encouraging immigrants to develop a sense of belonging to their host country. For example, Canada has the highest permanent immigration rates in the world. The Canadian government encourages immigrants to build a sense of belonging to Canada, and has fostered a more inclusive concept of national identity which includes both people born in Canada and immigrants. Some countries are less inclusive. For example, Russia has experienced two major waves of immigration influx, one in the 1990s, and the other one after 1998. Immigrants were perceived negatively by the Russian people and were viewed as "unwelcome and abusive guests". Immigrants were considered outsiders and were excluded from sharing the national identity of belonging to Russia.

Globalization 
As the world becomes increasingly globalized, international tourism, communication and business collaboration has increased. People around the world cross national borders more frequently to seek cultural exchange, education, business, and different lifestyles. Globalization promotes common values and experiences, and it also encourages the identification with the global community. People may adapt cosmopolitanism and view themselves as global beings, or world citizens. This trend may threaten national identity because globalization undermines the importance of being a citizen of a particular country.

Several researchers examined globalization and its impact on national identity found that as a country becomes more globalized, patriotism declined, which suggests that the increase of globalization is associated with less loyalty and less willingness to fight for one's own country. However, even a nation like Turkey that occupies an important geographic trade crossroads and international marketplace with a tradition of liberal economic activity with an ingrained entrepreneurial and foreign trade has degrees of ethnocentrism as Turkish consumers may be basically rational buyers by not discriminating against imported products, but they exhibit preferences for local goods that are of equal quality to the imports because buying them assists the nation's economy and domestic employment.

Issues 

In some cases, national identity collides with a person's civil identity. For example, many Israeli Arabs associate themselves with the Arab or Palestinian nationality, while at the same time they are citizens of the state of Israel, which is in conflict with the Palestinian nationality. Taiwanese also face a conflict of national identity with civil identity as there have been movements advocating formal "Taiwan Independence" and renaming "Republic of China" to "Republic of Taiwan." Residents in Taiwan are issued national identification cards and passports under the country name "Republic of China", and a portion of them do not identify themselves with "Republic of China", but rather with "Republic of Taiwan".

Markers 
National identity markers are those characteristics used to identify a person as possessing a particular national identity. These markers are not fixed but fluid, varying from culture to culture and also within a culture over time. Such markers may include common language or dialect, national dress, birthplace, family affiliation, etc.

See also 

 Cosmopolitanism
 Culture of the United States
 Ethnic group
 Ethnocentrism
 Globalization
 Identity (social science)
 Indonesian National Awakening
 Identity crisis
 Nationalism
 Patriotism
 Social identity theory
 Global citizenship
 Volkstum
 Volksgeist

References

Sources

External links

 
Nationalism
Ethnology